Dexelvucitabine is a failed experimental agent for the management of human immunodeficiency virus infection.  It is a cytidine nucleoside analog and nucleoside reverse transcriptase inhibitor. that inhibits HIV-1 replication in vitro. During phase II clinical trials there was some indication of a decreased mean viral load in patients with infected human immunodeficiency virus.

On April 3, 2006, Pharmasset and Incyte, the pharmaceutical companies developing dexelvucitabine, announced the decision to cease further trials and development of the drug due to an increased incidence of grade 4 hyperlipasemia (an excess of the pancreatic enzyme lipase in the bloodstream) in a phase II trial.

References

Abandoned drugs
Dihydrofurans
Nucleoside analog reverse transcriptase inhibitors
Organofluorides
Pyrimidones
Hydroxymethyl compounds